is a city in Kyoto Prefecture, Japan, which served as the capital city of Japan (Nagaoka-kyō) for a decade from 784 to 794.
Its neighbor cities are Kyoto and Nagaokakyō.
As of 2017, the city has an estimated population of 56,859 and a population density of 7,219 persons per km². The total area is 7.72 km²(2.98 sq mi).  According to the provisional results of the 2015 national census of Japan, the population of Muko is 56,859; of which male and female are 27,119 and 29,740 respectively.

History

Classical Mukō 

At the end of the 8th century, Emperor Kanmu moved his capital from Heijō-kyō to Nagaoka-kyō. The new capital encompassed a large part of modern Muko, where modern research has revealed the palace to have been located. In the south, it also included parts of Nagaokakyō. In 794, because of the location's moist temperature and reputation as a breeding ground for disease, Kammu relocated his capital from Nagaoka to Heian-kyō, now known as Kyoto.

Medieval Mukō 
Muko town was established in 1592, during Azuchi–Momoyama period. The town's main road, called Saigoku Kaido, flourished because it connected Tō-ji in Kyoto and Nishinomiya Shrine in Settsu Province. Saigoku Kaido, which still presents a traditional and historical setting, changed name National Route 171 as important road.

Modern Mukō 
Mukōmachi Station opened on July 26, 1876. Higashi-Mukō Station and Nishi-Mukō Station opened on December 1, 1928.
The Muko city was founded on October 1, 1972.

Geography

Muko adjoins northern Nagaoka, is surrounded by Kyoto on other three sides. There are bamboo groves are found on the hillside on the west of the city. Residential area for Kyoto and Osaka is expanded to the hill, encroaches on bamboo groves. The , the large keyhole-shaped kofun dated to 4th century, is located in the center of the hill chain.

Demographics
Per Japanese census data, the population of Mukō saw rapid growth in the late 20th century as the city developed as a residential community, and it has grown at a slower pace since then.

Politics and government 
Mukō is governed by the mayor Mamoru Yasuda, an independent. The city assembly has 20 members. In 2018 the Japanese Communist Party had a presence in local politics with six members in the assembly.

Elections include:
 2007 Mukō city assembly election

Sister cities
Mukō has been a sister city to Saratoga, California, United States since 1983.
, Saratoga, California
, Hangzhou, Zhejiang

Facilities 
Mukomachi Saty Center
Mukomachi Saty is a six-level shopping center with car parking located approximately 170 metres (a three-minute walk) from Higashi Muko station on Hankyu Kyoto line and 630 metres (an eight-minute walk) from JR Mukomachi station.
There is an Aeon Department Store, a Japanese restaurant and a casual dining area.  A specialty tea stand on the first floor sells a variety of tea from around Japan.

References

External links 

  

 
Cities in Kyoto Prefecture